Abram Molarsky (also Abraham; September 25, 1880 – May 4, 1955) was an American Impressionist and Post-Impressionist artist, known primarily as a landscape painter and a colorist. His work is characterized by rich hues and strong, textured brushwork. 	

Born in a Jewish family in Kyiv, Russian Empire (now Ukraine), he immigrated with his family to the United States in 1887. In 1889 he began studying painting at the Pennsylvania Academy of the Fine Arts in Philadelphia. His teachers included William Merritt Chase, Thomas Anshutz, and Cecilia Beaux. Abram Molarsky and his younger brother Maurice Molarsky, who was also a student at the Pennsylvania Academy, went to Paris to continue their artistic studies in 1906. Abram returned to Philadelphia in 1908, where he married artist Sarah Ann Shreve.

In 1913, Molarsky had his first solo show at the Doll & Richards Gallery in Boston, where he and his wife had settled. "Molarsky's color is delicate, refined and harmonious," wrote critic William Howe Downes, who had authored books about American painters Winslow Homer and John Singer Sargent. After five years in the Boston area, the family moved to Nutley, New Jersey, where Molarsky spent the rest of his life. Many of the landscapes he painted are scenes of the local parks, woods and fields near Nutley, where he and his wife often worked plein air. During the summers, they often painted in Provincetown, Gloucester and Rockport, Massachusetts. In 1922 a writer for The Boston Evening Transcript visited Molarsky's summer studio in Gloucester and wrote that the paintings had "a rich and translucent patina of color." He described one landscape: "Delightful to the senses is a little scene from the moors overlooking the harbor, with its fresh notations of color, flight of green, soft distance and rolling clouds."

Throughout his career, Molarsky showed at many galleries and museums, including the Pennsylvania Academy of Fine Arts, the Corcoran Gallery, the National Academy of Design, the Art Institute of Chicago, the Montclair Art Museum and the Newark Museum. In New York, he was represented by the Milch Gallery. In addition to doing his own work, Molarsky taught plein air painting, watercolor and pastel to students in Nutley for many years.

References

Sources
 Who's Who in American Art, 1947.
 Who's Who in American Art, 1953.
 Who Was Who in American Art, 1564-1975.
 The Artists Bluebook, Lonnie Pierson Dunbier (editor), 2005.
 Annual Exhibition Record, 1876–1913, Pennsylvania Academy of the Fine Arts.
 The Annual Exhibition Record of the Art Institute of Chicago.
 Annual Exhibition Record, National Academy of Design, 1901–1950.
 Biennial Exhibition Record of the Corcoran Gallery of Art.
 Pennsylvania Academy of the Fine Arts – archives on Abram & Maurice Molarsky.
 Pennsylvania Academy of the Fine Arts – annual exhibition records for Abram Molarsky.
 Abram (aka Abraham) Molarsky's 1905 passport application.
 Who’s Who of American Women, 1957 (Sarah Ann Shreve Molarsky).
 The New York Times, May 11, 1928, "Out of Town: Art News."
 The New York Times, March 13, 1934, "National Academy Show opens today."

External links
 Abram Molarsky on AskArt.com
 Abram Molarsky on ArtNet.com
 Abram Molarsky at the Smithsonian American Art Museum

1880 births
1955 deaths
American Jews
American Impressionist painters
American landscape painters
Jewish painters
Post-impressionist painters
Artists from Kyiv
People from Nutley, New Jersey
Emigrants from the Russian Empire to the United States
20th-century American painters
American male painters
20th-century American male artists
Public Works of Art Project artists